The Seattle Symphony is an American orchestra based in Seattle, Washington. Since 1998, the orchestra is resident at Benaroya Hall. The orchestra also serves as the accompanying orchestra for the Seattle Opera.

History

Beginnings

The orchestra gave its first performance on December 29, 1903, with Harry West conducting. Known from its founding as the Seattle Symphony, it was renamed in 1911 as the Seattle Philharmonic Orchestra. In 1919, the orchestra was reorganized with new bylaws under the name Seattle Symphony Orchestra. The 1921–22 season was cancelled due to financial problems.  The orchestra was revived in 1926 under the direction of Karl Krueger.

Pacific Northwest Symphony Orchestra
In 1947, the Seattle Symphony merged with the Tacoma Philharmonic to form the Pacific Northwest Symphony Orchestra. Performances were held in Seattle, Tacoma, and Olympia, with conducting duties split between Carl Bricken and Eugene Linden.  This arrangement ceased after one season, when the Seattle Symphony decided to withdraw from it.  A feud between the musicians and the board surfaced in 1948, and a majority of the musicians divorced themselves from the board and created a new orchestra called the Seattle Orchestra, a partnership (collective) operated by the musicians themselves, who chose Linden as their conductor.
The Seattle Symphony announced a separate orchestra season with eighteen concerts at the old Meany Hall for the Performing Arts on the University of Washington campus. The symphony was to be directed by Stanley Chapple, and a series of guest conductors: Artur Rodzinski, Jacques Singer, and Erich Leinsdorf.  Personnel for the Seattle Symphony were announced in the press on October 24, 1948, and included a few musicians who had chosen not to defect to the Seattle Orchestra and some new faces as well.  The Seattle Symphony season was then postponed and eventually cancelled. The Seattle Orchestra, meanwhile, gave its first performance on November 23, 1948.  An accommodation was reached between the Seattle Symphony and the Seattle Orchestra, and the two organizations merged, and the name "Seattle Symphony Orchestra" was retained. The partnership system was also retained, and musicians gained access onto the board.   The partnership system was eventually dissolved at the request of Milton Katims in 1955.  Even so, for most of its 100-year history, and especially today, the ensemble is known by the two-word name "Seattle Symphony".

Gerard Schwarz
Gerard Schwarz became music advisor of the orchestra in 1983 and principal conductor in 1984, before being named music director in 1985.  Under Schwarz's leadership, the orchestra became particularly known for performing works of twentieth-century composers, especially neglected American composers. Together, Schwarz and the orchestra have made more than 100 commercial recordings, including the major orchestral works of Howard Hanson and David Diamond as well as works by Charles Tomlinson Griffes, Walter Piston, Paul Creston, William Schuman, Alan Hovhaness, Morton Gould, David Diamond, and others, for Delos International and Naxos Records. The orchestra received its first Grammy nomination in January 1990 for a 1989 recording of music of Howard Hanson.  The orchestra also recorded a musical score to the SeaWorld, Orlando, stage show A'lure, The Call of the Ocean plus the score for the motion pictures Highlander II: The Quickening and Die Hard With a Vengeance.

Schwarz received praise for his championing of American composers and his skills in fund-raising.  However, his tenure was also marked by controversies between him and several symphony musicians, which included several legal disputes.  In September 2008, the orchestra announced the conclusion of Schwarz's music directorship after the 2010–2011 season, at which time Schwarz became the orchestra's conductor laureate.

Ludovic Morlot

Ludovic Morlot first guest-conducted the Seattle Symphony in October 2009.  He returned in April 2010, as a substitute conductor in the wake of the 2010 Eyjafjallajökull eruptions.  Based on these appearance, in June 2010, the orchestra announced the appointment of Morlot as its 15th music director, effective with the 2011–2012 season, with an initial contract of six years.  During Morlot's tenure, the orchestra initiated its own recording label, 'Seattle Symphony Media'.  In July 2015, the orchestra announced the extension of Morlot's contract through the 2018–2019 season.  Morlot has taken particular interest in fostering music from Seattle-based composers, including composers within the orchestra itself.  His work with the orchestra has included the commissioning and premiere of John Luther Adams' Become Ocean, which went on to win the 2014 Pulitzer Prize for Music and the 2015 Grammy Award for Best Classical Contemporary Composition.  The commercial recording of Become Ocean, for Cantaloupe Music, led to a donation by Taylor Swift to the Seattle Symphony of US$50,000.  Morlot and the orchestra have received additional Grammy Awards for their recordings of music of Henri Dutilleux.  In April 2017, the orchestra announced that Morlot is to conclude his tenure as music director at the end of the 2018–2019 season.

Thomas Dausgaard
Thomas Dausgaard first guest-conducted the orchestra in 2013.  In October 2013, the orchestra named Dausgaard its next principal guest conductor, effective with the 2014–2015 season, with an initial contract of 3 years.  In March 2016, the orchestra announced the extension of Dausgaard's contract as principal guest conductor through the 2019–2020 season.  In October 2017, the orchestra announced the appointment of Dausgaard as its next music director, effective with the 2019–2020 season, with an initial contract of 4 seasons. On 7 January 2022, Dausgaard resigned as music director by e-mail, with immediate effect.

Music directors

 Harry West (1903–1906)
 Michael Kegrize (1907–1909)
 Henry Hadley (1909–1911)
 John Spargur (1911–1921)
 Karl Krueger (1926–1932)
 Basil Cameron (1932–1938)
 Nikolai Sokoloff (1938–1941)
 Thomas Beecham (1941–1944)
 Carl Bricken (1944–1948)
 Eugene Linden (1948–1950)
 Manuel Rosenthal (1950–1951)
 Milton Katims (1954–1976)
 Rainer Miedél (1976–1983)
 Gerard Schwarz (1985–2011)
 Ludovic Morlot (2011–2019)
 Thomas Dausgaard (2019–2022)

Performance Venues

1903–1905 Christensen Hall, Arcade Building
1905–1906 Grand Opera House (Seattle, Washington)
1907–1911 Moore Theatre
1911–1919 Metropolitan Theatre
1919–1921 Meany Hall for the Performing Arts
1926–1938 Metropolitan Theatre
1938–1945 Music Hall
1945–1949 Moore Theatre
1949–1950 Meany Hall for the Performing Arts
1950–1953 Seattle Civic Auditorium
1953–1955 Orpheum Theatre
1955–1956 Moore Theatre
1956–1962 Orpheum Theatre
1962–1998 Seattle Opera House
1998–present Benaroya Hall

References

Further reading

External links
Seattle Symphony official website
University of Washington Libraries Digital Collections – The Milton Katims Audio Collection

American orchestras
Musical groups established in 1903
Non-profit organizations based in Seattle
Musical groups from Seattle
Wikipedia requested audio of orchestras
1903 establishments in Washington (state)
Performing arts in Washington (state)